Verkhny Olshan is a rural locality (a selo) in Olshanskoye Rural Settlement, Ostrogozhsky District, Voronezh Oblast, Russia. The population was 167 as of 2010. There are 5 streets.

Geography 
Verkhny Olshan is located 19 km southwest of Ostrogozhsk (the district's administrative centre) by road. Veretye is the nearest rural locality.

References 

Rural localities in Ostrogozhsky District